Lobelia dioica is a small herbaceous plant in the family Campanulaceae native to Western Australia.

It blooms between May and September producing white-blue-purple flowers.

The herb is found in damp areas along the edges of creeks and watercourses and in swamps scattered through the Kimberley region of Western Australia where it grows in sandy-clay soils.

References

dioica
Flora of Western Australia
Plants described in 1810
Dioecious plants